Brett Mason Rudolph III (born July 17, 1995) is an American football quarterback who is currently a free agent. He played college football at Oklahoma State, where he was a three-year starter and won the Johnny Unitas Golden Arm Award during his last year. He was selected by the Steelers in the third round of the 2018 NFL Draft.

Rudolph spent the 2018 season as the Steelers' third-string quarterback and saw no game action in the regular season. He saw starting action in 2019 after Ben Roethlisberger was injured early in the season. He would alternate starts with Devlin Hodges throughout the season.

Early years
Rudolph was named after his father and grandfather; he is not related to the former golfer Mason Rudolph. He attended Westminster Catawba Christian School before transferring to Northwestern High School in Rock Hill, South Carolina. During his career he passed for 10,986 yards and 132 passing touchdowns. During his senior season, he accounted for 80 total touchdowns and threw for 4,400 yards as he led the Trojans to a 15–0 record, 4A State Championship and #7 national ranking. He played in the Annual Shrine Bowl All-Star game was named the offensive MVP as he led South Carolina on a game-winning drive in the final 20 seconds. He was a finalist for South Carolina's "Mr Football" award. Rudolph was rated by Rivals.com as a four-star recruit and was ranked as the ninth-best pro-style quarterback in his class. He committed to Oklahoma State University to play college football.

College career
Rudolph entered his true freshman season in 2014 as a third string behind J. W. Walsh and Daxx Garman. After Walsh was injured, Garman became the starter with Rudolph as his backup. After Garman was injured, Rudolph started his first career game against Baylor. During the game, he completed 13 of 25 passes for 281 yards, two touchdowns and two interceptions. Rudolph remained the starter for the final two games, including the 2015 Cactus Bowl victory against Washington. In three games total, he completed 49 of 86 passes for 853 yards, six touchdowns, and four interceptions.

He was named the starter for the 2015 season in January of that year.

Rudolph is the winner of the 2017 Johnny Unitas Golden Arm Award, given annually to the country's outstanding senior college quarterback.

College statistics

Professional career
Rudolph attended the NFL Scouting Combine and completed the majority of combine drills, but opted to skip the bench press, broad jump, short shuttle, and three-cone drill. On March 15, 2018, he participated at Oklahoma State's pro day and completed the three-cone drill, short shuttle, broad jump, and ran passing drills. He met with scouts and team representatives from the Pittsburgh Steelers, New York Giants, and Los Angeles Chargers privately after completing his pro day. He attended private workout and visits with the New England Patriots, Buffalo Bills, New Orleans Saints, Cincinnati Bengals, Pittsburgh Steelers, New York Giants, and Los Angeles Chargers. At the conclusion of the pre-draft process, Rudolph was projected to be a second round pick by the majority of NFL draft experts and scouts. He was ranked as the sixth best quarterback prospect in the draft by DraftScout.com, Scouts Inc., and Sports Illustrated.

The Pittsburgh Steelers selected Rudolph in the third round (76th overall) of the 2018 NFL Draft. The Steelers traded their third-round (79th overall) and seventh-round (220th overall) picks to the Seattle Seahawks in order to move up three spots and select Rudolph with the 76th overall pick. Rudolph was the sixth quarterback selected in 2018.

2018 season
On May 23, 2018, the Steelers signed Rudolph to a four-year, $3.92 million contract that includes a signing bonus of $932,264.

Throughout training camp, Rudolph competed against Landry Jones and Joshua Dobbs for the backup spot behind Ben Roethlisberger. Head coach Mike Tomlin ultimately named Rudolph the third quarterback, as Jones was released. Rudolph did not receive a single snap in the 2018 season.

2019 season

During the preseason, Rudolph was named the second quarterback behind Roethlisberger, eclipsing Dobbs after multiple successful preseason performances.

During Week 2 against the Seattle Seahawks, Rudolph relieved an injured Roethlisberger in the second half and threw for 112 yards, two touchdowns, and an interception as the Steelers narrowly lost by a score of 26–28. Following the announcement that Roethlisberger would miss the rest of the season due to season-ending elbow surgery, Rudolph became the Steelers' starting quarterback. Rudolph made his first NFL start in Week 3 against the San Francisco 49ers. He threw for 174 yards, two touchdowns, and an interception in the 24–20 road loss. In the next game against the Cincinnati Bengals, Rudolph recorded his first win as a starter with 229 passing yards and two touchdowns in the 27–3 victory. The following week against the Baltimore Ravens, he suffered a concussion after being hit by Ravens safety Earl Thomas and was temporarily knocked unconscious, being relieved by Steelers third-string quarterback Devlin Hodges. Rudolph was cleared from concussion protocol on October 16, 2019. He returned to face the Miami Dolphins and threw for 251 yards, two touchdowns, and an interception in the 27–14 victory.

In Week 11 against the Cleveland Browns, with eight seconds left in regulation, Rudolph was involved in a brawl with several players from both teams. Rudolph completed a pass to running back Trey Edmunds. Myles Garrett of the Browns then tackled Rudolph late, after the pass had been completed. While the two were entangled on the ground, Rudolph pushed down and away on Garrett's helmet, attempting to pull Garrett's helmet off. Garrett then grabbed at Rudolph's helmet and removed it. When Rudolph ran after Garrett, Garrett struck Rudolph in the head with Rudolph's own helmet.
 During and after this altercation, additional players came into the fray and further fighting occurred. Rudolph finished with 221 passing yards, a touchdown, and four interceptions as the Steelers lost 21–7. Three players were ejected and later suspended for the incident, particularly Garrett who was suspended for the remainder of the 2019 season. For his role in the scuffle, Rudolph was fined $50,000 by the league. Rudolph later declined to file criminal charges, calling the situation an NFL matter.  Garrett claimed that Rudolph used a racial slur in the build-up to the altercation, but the NFL investigation found no evidence to support Garrett's claim.

In the following week against the still-winless Bengals, Rudolph struggled again, throwing for 85 yards and an interception before being benched for Devlin Hodges in the third quarter who led the Steelers to a 16–10 comeback victory. Two days later, Steelers' head coach Mike Tomlin announced that Hodges would remain the starting quarterback for the following week's game against Cleveland. During Week 16 against the New York Jets, Rudolph came into the game after struggles from Hodges in the second quarter, but later suffered a shoulder injury and left the game in the fourth quarter. During the game, Rudolph threw for 129 yards and a touchdown. Without Rudolph, the Steelers lost 10–16. It was revealed that he suffered a sternoclavicular joint dislocation in the shoulder and was placed on injured reserve on December 24, 2019. Overall, he started in eight out of the ten games in which he appeared, recorded 1,765 passing yards, 13 passing touchdowns, 9 interceptions, and posted a passer rating of 82.0.

2020 season
During Week 9 against the Dallas Cowboys, Rudolph came into the game in the second quarter after Roethlisberger went to the locker room with an ankle injury. Rudolph completed two of three passes for three yards before Roethlisberger came back in the second half. Rudolph also made appearances in relief of Roethlisberger in the 4th quarter of blowout wins against the Cleveland Browns, Cincinnati Bengals, and Jacksonville Jaguars.

On December 29, 2020, with the Steelers already locking up the AFC North, head coach Mike Tomlin announced that Rudolph would start the season finale against the Cleveland Browns in order to rest Roethlisberger. In that game, Rudolph threw for 315 yards, two touchdowns, and an interception in the 24–22 road loss.

2021 season
Rudolph signed a one-year contract extension with the Steelers on April 29, 2021. On Week 10 against the Detroit Lions Rudolph got his first start of the season when Ben Roethlisberger was ruled out with COVID-19. Rudolph threw for 242 yards, a touchdown, and an interception in the 16–16 tie.

2022 season 
Rudolph was listed behind Mitchell Trubisky and Kenny Pickett as QB3. Rudolph was relegated to third-string QB duties throughout the preseason.

NFL career statistics

References

External links
Pittsburgh Steelers bio
Oklahoma State Cowboys bio

1995 births
Living people
People from Rock Hill, South Carolina
Players of American football from South Carolina
American football quarterbacks
Oklahoma State Cowboys football players
Pittsburgh Steelers players